"Pi's Lullaby" is the Tamil-language intro song of the 2012 film Life of Pi. It was composed by Mychael Danna, with lyrics by Bombay Jayashri, who also performed the song. The song earned a nomination at the 85th Academy Awards for Best Original Song. The nomination marks the first ever Tamil song to be nominated in the category.

According to Jayashri's blog, in order to convey the mood he wanted for the song, director Ang Lee told her "A child sleeps not because he is sleepy, but because he feels safe."

Controversy 
The Irayimman Thampi Memorial Trust alleged that the first eight lines of "Pi's Lullaby" were not an original composition but a mere translation into Tamil of Irayimman Thampi's famous lullaby in Malayalam, "Omanathinkal Kidavo". Jayashri however maintains that she merely wrote what came to her heart and has denied the allegation against her.

References

External links
 http://www.business-standard.com/article/beyond-business/a-case-of-two-lullabies-113031500573_1.html

2012 songs
Songs written for films
Songs involved in plagiarism controversies
Lullabies